Jörg Illing (born 2 October 1964) is a retired German football defender.

References

1964 births
Living people
German footballers
VfB Fortuna Chemnitz players
Chemnitzer FC players
FC Bayern Hof players
DDR-Oberliga players
2. Bundesliga players
Association football defenders